Adam Benjamin may refer to:

Adam Benjamin, Jr. (1935–1982), American politician
Adam Benjamin (musician), American jazz keyboardist and composer

See also

Adam (disambiguation)
Benjamin (disambiguation)

ben adam
Ben Adam